Josip Barišić (born 7 March 1981 in Slavonski Brod) is a Croatian retired football player.

References

External links

 OTIŠLI - LJETO 2011. 

1981 births
Living people
Sportspeople from Slavonski Brod
Association football defenders
Croatian footballers
NK Marsonia players
NK Zagreb players
NK Karlovac players
Shonan Bellmare players
NK Croatia Sesvete players
HŠK Posušje players
A.F.C. Tubize players
NK Inter Zaprešić players
NK Sesvete players
Croatian Football League players
J2 League players
Premier League of Bosnia and Herzegovina players
Belgian Pro League players
First Football League (Croatia) players
Croatian expatriate footballers
Expatriate footballers in Japan
Croatian expatriate sportspeople in Japan
Expatriate footballers in Bosnia and Herzegovina
Croatian expatriate sportspeople in Bosnia and Herzegovina
Expatriate footballers in Belgium
Croatian expatriate sportspeople in Belgium